Bağdatlı may refer to:

 Bağdatlı, Feke
 Bağdatlı, Sungurlu
 Bağdatlı, Ulus